Anbasa ibn Suḥaym al-Kalbi was the Muslim wali (governor) of al-Andalus, from 721 to 726. Although his birthplace is unknown, it is likely he was from the Hejaz region.

Immediately after his appointment, Anbasa doubled taxes on Christians; however, it is thought that this increase did not affect most of the recently conquered estates and towns, subdued by treaty on very specific conditions (taxes, land ownership, etc.), but lands under direct Arab rule and new towns being conquered in Septimania.

Coincidentally, a dynastic struggle arose among Muslims in the Middle East. It was sparked by the death of Caliph Yazid II and the succession of his brother, Hisham ibn Abd al-Malik in 724. On this account, Anbasa tried to please the demands imposed by the Caliph to further tax exaction on non-Muslims, with attempts being made to enforce it on non-Arab Muslims too; there was a popular rebellion in Egypt in 725 for increase in taxation. On the other hand, this more rigorous approach may have provided legal shelter and security to ownership in al-Andalus.

These actions caused displeasure, scattered acts of disobedience, as well as some open revolts. During his tenure in office, Pelagius of Asturias, defied the Umayyad attempt to extract taxes in the mountains of Asturias, where he gathered a band of rebellious followers. An Umayyad patrol was sent to search for Pelagius and his men, and it was ambushed at the Battle of Covadonga at great loss of life according to heavily mythical Christian sources, a skirmish according to later Muslim chroniclers, who showed little concern for the episode; The Mozarabic Chronicle of 754, a Christian and only almost contemporary account of the major events taking place in Hispania doesn't mention it. In retrospect, these events are viewed by some as the beginning of the Reconquista, an effort by Christian kingdoms to wrest control of Hispania from the Muslims.

Following the major Ummayyad defeat in Toulouse (721) resulting in Al-Samh ibn Malik al-Khawlani's death, Anbasa dispatched several military expeditions into Septimania, and managed to capture the Visigothic town of Carcassonne in 724 (or 725), as well as Nîmes, the latter without resistance. He went on to lead an expedition to the Kingdom of Burgundy, a Frankish territory, as far north as Autun and Sens. However, he died of natural causes in 726 during his campaign in Aquitaine. Meanwhile, a flow of refugees found shelter in southern Aquitaine and Provence. He was succeeded as wali by Udrra ben Abd Allah al-Fihrí, who after a few months, was replaced by Yahya ibn Salama al-Kalbi. Yahya denounced the injustices of the policies of Anbasa, especially with respect to the collection of taxes and the confiscation of property.

Notes

See also
 Islamic invasion of Gaul
 History of the Jews under Muslim rule
 List of Caliphs

726 deaths
8th-century Arabs
Umayyad governors of Al-Andalus
Umayyad conquest of Hispania
Arab generals
Generals of the Umayyad Caliphate
Year of birth unknown
Banu Kalb
8th-century people from the Umayyad Caliphate